The Central Bank of the Congo is the central bank of the Democratic Republic of the Congo.  The bank's main offices are on Boulevard Colonel Tshatshi in La Gombe in Kinshasa.

The bank is engaged in developing policies to promote financial inclusion and is a member of the Alliance for Financial Inclusion. On 5 May 2012 the Central Bank of the Democratic Republic of Congo announced it would be making specific commitments to financial inclusion under the Maya Declaration.

Regional operations

The central bank operates a network of regional branches across the DRC, the largest country in Sub-Saharan Africa. Branches can be found in Lubumbashi, Goma,  Kamina, Kasumbalesa, Kikwit, Tshikapa, Ilebo and Matadi. In cities where the central bank is not present, a commercial bank can be appointed to represent it; Trust Merchant Bank performs such a role in Likasi and Kolwezi.

History

From 1886 to 1908, King Leopold II of the Belgians ruled the Congo Free State as his private domain. On July 27, 1887, he issued a Royal decree that established the Franc as the money of account for the Congo Free State, and for Ruanda-Urundi. In 1890, the Heligoland-Zanzibar Treaty put Ruanda-Urundi within the German Empire's sphere of influence in Africa. Consequently, the German East African rupie became the official currency in Ruanda-Urundi though the Franc continued to circulate there. In 1908, Belgium assumed direct responsibility for the Congo, taking it from Leopold; as a result, the Belgian Congo became a member of the Latin Monetary Union.

In 1909, a number of Belgian banks jointly established the Banque du Congo Belge (Dutch: Bank van Belgisch Congo; English: Bank of the Belgian Congo). This freed the Bank to act as the agent in the Congo for all the major Belgian banks rather than as a subsidiary or affiliate of only one of them. However, the dominant bank was the Société Générale de Belgique and eventually it became the Bank's majority owner. In 1911 the Colonial government awarded the Bank a 25-year monopoly on the right of note issuance for the Colony and appointed it as fiscal agent for the colonial government.  The Bank issued its first banknotes in 1912.

Following Germany's defeat in the First World War, Belgium assumed a League of Nations mandate over Ruanda-Urundi. Belgium then included them in the Congo Franc Zone.

The Convention of 10 October 1927 revisited the question of note issuance and extended the Bank's monopoly until 1 July 1952. During the Second World War, Belgium came under German occupation.  The Bank of England then assumed a temporary involvement in the Congo's affairs and the Congo franc was listed in London.

On 1 July 1952, the day after the expiration of the Bank's monopoly, the newly formed Banque Centrale du Congo Belge et du Ruanda-Urundi assumed responsibility for note issuance. The Banque Centrale du Congo-Belge et du Ruanda-Urundi was dissolved after the Belgian Congo's independence in 1960. The Banque Nationale du Congo was created in 1964 to serve as the Congo's new central bank.

For about four years from 1960 to 1964, the Banque d'Emission du Rwanda et du Burundi served as the central bank for the linked territories. In 1961 Rwanda became an independent republic; the next year Burundi became independent as a monarchy. In 1964 each state established its own central bank, the Royal Bank of Burundi and the Banque Nationale du Rwanda. In 1966, Burundi became a republic and its central bank changed its name to Banque de la République du Burundi.
 
When the Congo changed its name to Zaire in 1971, the Banque Nationale du Congo became the Bank of Zaire. Then in 1997, when the country's name became the Democratic Republic of the Congo, the bank took its current name.

See also
Economy of the Democratic Republic of the Congo
List of governors of the Banque Centrale du Congo
Central banks and currencies of Africa

References

Sources
Banque du Congo belge. 1959. Banque du Congo belge, 1909-1959. Bruxelles, Editions L. Cuypers

External links
  Official site of Banque Centrale du Congo

Congo, Democratic Republic of
Economy of the Democratic Republic of the Congo
Banks of the Democratic Republic of the Congo
Kinshasa
Banks established in 1997
1997 establishments in the Democratic Republic of the Congo